Megasphaera is a genus of Bacillota bacteria classified within the class Negativicutes.

This classification has been reexamined. It appears that this genus is a member of the Clostridia.


Phylogeny
The currently accepted taxonomy is based on the List of Prokaryotic names with Standing in Nomenclature (LPSN) and National Center for Biotechnology Information (NCBI)

Unassigned species:
 "M. butyrica" Hitch et al. 2021
 "M. vaginalis" Bordigoni et al. 2020 non Srinivasan et al. 2021

See also
 List of bacterial vaginosis microbiota
 List of bacterial orders
 List of bacteria genera

References

 Arik, H. D., Gulsen, N., Hayirli, A., & Alatas, M. S. (2019). Efficacy of Megasphaera elsdenii inoculation in subacute ruminal acidosis in cattle. Journal of animal physiology and animal nutrition, 103(2), 416–426.

Veillonellaceae
Gram-negative bacteria
Bacterial vaginosis
Bacteria genera